Patrick Galbraith and Brett Steven were the defending champions, but Galbraith did not participate this year.  Steven partnered James Greenhalgh, losing in the quarterfinals.

Jeff Tarango and Daniel Vacek won the title, defeating Jiří Novák and David Rikl 7–5, 7–5 in the final.

Seeds

  Ellis Ferreira /  Rick Leach (first round)
  Jiří Novák /  David Rikl (final)
  Jeff Tarango /  Daniel Vacek (champions)
  Menno Oosting /  Pavel Vízner (first round)

Draw

Draw

External links
Draw

ATP Auckland Open
1999 ATP Tour